Ocularia albolineata is a species of beetle in the family Cerambycidae. It was described by Villiers in 1942. It contains the varietas Ocularia albolineata var. pantosi.

References

Oculariini
Beetles described in 1942